Tuluka (or Tulucay; Re-ho, Tu-lo-kai-di-sel, Tulkays) is a former Patwin village in Napa County, California. It was located southeast of Napa, but its precise location is unknown.

References

Patwin
Former settlements in Napa County, California
Former populated places in California
Former Native American populated places in California
Wintun villages